Orobanche mutelii, the dwarf broomrape, is a species of plant in family Orobanchaceae. It is endemic to Malta.

References 

Endemic flora of Malta
mutelii
Plants described in 1835